Mostafa Fatemi is an electrical engineer at the Mayo Clinic in Rochester, Minnesota. He was named a Fellow of the Institute of Electrical and Electronics Engineers (IEEE) in 2012 for his contribution to ultrasound radiation force imaging and tissue characterization.

References

External links

20th-century births
Living people
Mayo Clinic people
Fellow Members of the IEEE
Year of birth missing (living people)
Place of birth missing (living people)
American electrical engineers